Sheikhsar  (formally known as Sukhchainpura) is a village in Lunkaransar tehsil of Bikaner district in Rajasthan, India. It is situated on the north-east border of the district adjoining Churu and Hanumangarh district boundaries. The village has a population of 5820 out of them are Scheduled Caste(SC) 1182 and Scheduled Tribe(ST)  4.

History 
Formerly it was the capital of the princely state of Sheikhsar which later got merge with the princely state of Bikaner.

Sheikhsar State 
The Jat zamindar Pandu Godara of Ladhadia was in love with Malki, the daughter of the Jat zamindar Raisal Beniwal of Raslana and the princess Malki also loved him. But her father got her married to the Jat zamindar Phula Saharan of the princely state of Bharag. Princess Malki sent a message through her spy to King Pandu Godara that he should take her away. Taking this message, Pandu Godara attacked Bhadaga with his army and went away with Malki. Due to this action of his, other Jat rulers attacked the princely state of Pandu Godara and Pandu could not fight them alone, so he took the help of Rao Bika, son of Rao Jodha, with his help he escaped from Ladhadia but his princely state Ladhadia suffered heavy losses. Later Godara Jats established a new princely state, Sheikhsar and Pandu Godara donated his entire princely state to Rao Bika in return for his help, which later came to be known as the princely state of Bikaner, from here the Jat dynasty ended on Jangladesh and the Rajput dynasty began.

Origin of Village Name 
Baba Sheikh Farid visited northern areas of Rajasthan and lived there for long time. And his spiritual teachings affected people. In the Sukhchainpura village of Rajasthan, Baba Sheikh Farid made salty water drinkable, by his Yoga Maya. And people of Sukhchainpura village been so impressed by 'Yog Power' and devotion of Baba that they changed the name of village to Sheikhsar.

References

External links
LDCA BSNL, Bikaner

Bikaner district
Villages in Bikaner district
Former states and territories
Princely states of India
Princely states of Rajasthan